A Roller Coaster Ride! - When an IITian Met a BITSian Girl is a 2010 novel written by Saumil Shrivastava, a BTech from Indian Institute of Technology (IIT) Bombay. It is his debut novel. The novel got recommended by Sanjeev Kotnala, Vice President Dainik Bhaskar Group. According to him this is the first CAMOBS (Campus and First Job) novel which bridges the gap left by new emerging IIT - IIM campus experience authors.

A Roller Coaster Ride is published by Srishti Publishers.

References

External links

2010 debut novels
Indian English-language novels
2010 Indian novels